Danijela Grgić (born 28 September 1988 in Banja Luka, Bosnia and Herzegovina, Yugoslavia) is a Croatian athlete competing mainly in the 400 metres. She is the national record holder over that distance. She won the silver medal at the 2007 Summer Universiade in Bangkok.

Competition record

Personal bests
Outdoor
200 metres – 23.69 (+0.4 m/s) (Varaždin 2006)
400 metres – 50.78 (Beijing 2006) NR
Indoor
200 metres – 24.15 (Budapest 2006)
400 metres – 52.91 (Moscow 2006)

References

1988 births
Living people
Croatian female sprinters
Universiade medalists in athletics (track and field)
Sportspeople from Banja Luka
Universiade silver medalists for Croatia
Medalists at the 2007 Summer Universiade
Athletes (track and field) at the 2009 Mediterranean Games
Mediterranean Games competitors for Croatia
21st-century Croatian women